The D'Agapeyeff cipher is a cipher that appears in the first edition of Codes and Ciphers, an elementary book on cryptography published by the Russian-born English cryptographer and cartographer Alexander D'Agapeyeff in 1939.

Offered as a "challenge cipher" at the end of the book, the ciphertext is:

It was not included in later editions, and D'Agapeyeff is said to have admitted later to having forgotten how he had encrypted it.

Use of nulls in ciphertext 
It is possible that not all the ciphertext characters are used in decryption and that some characters are nulls. Evidence for this is given by the author on p. 111 of the text under the sub-section heading Military Codes and Ciphers:

"The cipher is of course easily made out, but if every third, fourth, or fifth letter, as may be previously arranged, is a dummy inserted after a message has been put into cipher, it is then extremely difficult to decipher unless you are in the secret."

While the index of coincidence for the D'Agapeyeff cipher is 1.812 when taken in pairs horizontally (e.g., '75' '62' '82'), the letter frequency distribution is too flat for a 196 character message written in English.

Additionally, D'Agapeyeff left two ciphers for the reader to solve. Each are approximately 100 characters in length and have an index of coincidence much higher than what is expected for English plaintext.

Use of Polybius square methods in Codes and Ciphers 

The structure of the D'Agapeyeff Cipher has similarities to the Polybius square, which the author used as examples in his book. He explicitly solves an example of a Polybius square based cipher from a friend in his cryptanalysis section of the book. This worked example consisted of 178 characters:

When deciphered with a Polybius square, the plaintext contains a mistake (based on mis-encoding "E" as "BE" rather than "CE"), but reads:

"THE NEW PLAN OF ATTACK INCLUDES OPERATIONS BY THREE BOMBER SQUADRONS OVER FACTORY ARYA [AREA] SOUTHWEST OF THE RIVER"

References 
 Shulman, David (nom: Ab Struse). "The D'Agapeyeff Cryptogram: A Challenge", The Cryptogram, April/May 1952: 39-40, 46.
 Shulman, David (nom: Ab Struse). "D'Agapeyeff	Cipher:	Postscript", The Cryptogram, March/April 1959: 80-81.
 Barker, Wayne G (1978). "The Unsolved D'Agapeyeff Cipher", Cryptologia, 2(2): 144-147
 List of famous unsolved codes, maintained by cryptographer Elonka Dunin
 D'Agapeyeff, Alexander. Codes and Ciphers, 1939, Oxford University Press, p. 158

External links
Description of properties and potential decryption strategies for D'Agapeyeff cipher by Robert Matthews
Another approach to decryption by Nick Pelling
Discussion of possible causes of failure to solve D'Agapeyeff cipher, at the American Cryptogram Association website

Undeciphered historical codes and ciphers